Elizabeth Brown (6 August 1830 – 5 March 1899)
was a British astronomer and Quaker who specialized in solar observation, especially sunspots and solar eclipses.

She was instrumental in founding the British Astronomical Association and was also one of the first women Fellows of the Royal Meteorological Society.

Elizabeth was born and lived in Cirencester, Gloucestershire. Her father, Thomas Brown, introduced her to science, including observing sunspots and taking meteorological measurements, notably, of rainfall. She took over her father's meteorological observations from 1871 until his death aged 91 in 1883. After this release of domestic and filial duties, she began to travel the world to make observations of solar eclipses, publishing two anonymous accounts of her travels.

She was admitted to the Liverpool Astronomical Society following the death of her father. At this time the society operated as an association of amateur astronomers across Britain, rather than as a local organisation. Brown travelled a 140-mile round journey from Cirencester to Liverpool to attend its meetings. She soon afterwards became the director of its Solar Section.

Brown had a central role in organising the formation of the British Astronomical Association in 1890, to coordinate the work of amateur astronomers. She became the Director of the new Association's Solar Section, a post which she held until her death in 1899. She also contributed to the activities of other observing sections, including the lunar, variable star and coloured star sections. Following Elizabeth’s death her sister, Jemima (1832-1907), also became a BAA member. Jemima looked after the astronomical instruments that Elizabeth had bequeathed to the Association.

The British Astronomical Association accepted women as members from its start, unlike the Royal Astronomical Society. Brown was one of three women proposed for fellowship of the Royal Astronomical Society in 1892, but all three controversially failed to attract sufficient votes for election (the other two were Alice Everett and Annie Russell; similarly, the nomination of Isis Pogson had been rejected in 1886). She was elected to Fellowship of the Royal Meteorological Society on 19 April 1893.

Elizabeth Brown travelled widely to seek for solar eclipses, an adventure she describes in her work In Pursuit of a Shadow (1887). The title of the book reveals the influence of the earlier Quaker meteorologist Luke Howard who famously used the phrase to describe his work on clouds. A second set of memoirs, Caught in the Tropics, appeared in 1890. Her daily recording of sunspots, including meticulous drawings, earned her a distinguished reputation.

Publications

In popular culture
Elizabeth Brown's story inspired a play by David Elder, The Making of Miss Brown, which was premiered at the Stroud Theatre Festival in 2020. It remains available to watch online for a small fee.

Further reading

See also
Timeline of women in science

References

1830 births
1899 deaths
19th-century British astronomers
Women astronomers
19th-century British women scientists
People from Cirencester